The South Fork Solomon River is a  river in the central Great Plains of North America. The entire length of the river lies in the U.S. state of Kansas. It is a tributary of the Solomon River.

Geography
The South Fork Solomon River rises in Sherman County, Kansas, and flows eastward through Thomas and Sheridan counties into Graham County.

The South Fork Solomon River travels across Graham County roughly following the course of Highway 24. The river runs through Bogue, Hill City, Penokee, Morland and Studley, and is impounded eight miles west of Stockton, Kansas in Rooks County to form the large Webster Reservoir.

The river then joins the North Fork Solomon River at Waconda Lake in northwestern Mitchell County, forming the Solomon River.

See also
List of rivers of Kansas

References

External links 
About the Solomon Valley at the Solomon Valley Highway 24 Heritage Alliance

Rivers of Graham County, Kansas
Rivers of Mitchell County, Kansas
Rivers of Osborne County, Kansas
Rivers of Kansas
Rivers of Rooks County, Kansas
Rivers of Sheridan County, Kansas
Rivers of Sherman County, Kansas
Rivers of Thomas County, Kansas
Tributaries of the Kansas River